Chapultepec is a city park in Mexico City.

Chapultepec may also refer to:
Chapultepec Zoo, a zoo in the park
Chapultepec Castle, a castle in the park
Museo Nacional de Historia, located inside the castle
Battle of Chapultepec, an 1847 battle in Mexico City
Chapultepec metro station, a Mexico City Metro station serving the zone
Chapultepec (Mexico City Metrobús), a BRT station in Mexico City
Chapultepec Uno, a skyscraper in Mexico City
Chapultepec, State of Mexico, a town and municipality
Chapultepec splitfin, a Critically Endangered species of fish

See also
Lomas de Chapultepec, a colonia near Chapultepec
Chapultepec aqueduct, an aqueduct in Chapultepec
Chapultepec Peace Accords, a 1992 Salvadorian peace treaty